was a Japanese engineer and naval architect of the Meiji period and a career officer in the Imperial Japanese Navy.

Biography
Sasō was born in Kanazawa Domain (present day Kanazawa, Ishikawa) as the fourth son of Horio Jirobei, a samurai in the service of the Maeda clan, and was adopted at an early age by the Sasō family. In 1869, he entered the predecessor to the Imperial Japanese Naval Academy, and from 1871 to 1878 was sent to England for further studies. After his return to Japan in January 1879, he was made deputy general manager of the Shipbuilding Division within the Ministry of the Navy. He subsequently travelled to Europe to visit shipyards, and was eventually promoted to commandant of the Yokosuka Naval Arsenal and other posts within the Navy Ministry, rising to the position of Vice Admiral. He was awarded an honorary doctorate of engineering in 1899.

Reference and further reading 
 
 
 

1852 births
1905 deaths
People from Ishikawa Prefecture
Japanese expatriates in the United Kingdom
Japanese naval architects
Imperial Japanese Navy admirals
People of Meiji-period Japan